Oleksandr Kamyshin (born on 2 July 1984) is a Ukrainian railway executive who was the CEO of state-owned Ukrainian Railways from August 2021 to late February 2023.

Biography 
Oleksandr Kamyshin was born on 2 July 1984 in Kyiv (then Kiev) in the Ukrainian SSR, Soviet Union. From 2001 to 2007 Kamyshin studied finance at the Igor Sikorsky Kyiv Polytechnic Institute. In 2006 he started his professional career as an auditor at KPMG, he left the company in 2008. From 2008 to 2012 he was the General Director of Kyiv Motorcycle Plant while also working for the investment management company Dragon Capital. In 2012 Kamyshin became an investment manager at SCM Holdings. 

Kamyshin left SCM in 2019. In January 2020 Kamyshin became a managing partner of Fortior Capital. 

On 11 August 2021 Kamyshin was appointed acting CEO of state-owned Ukrainian Railways. At the time he was advisor to Minister of Infrastructure of Ukraine Oleksandr Kubrakov. Kamyshin was acting CEO, until he in March 2022 was appointed CEO. Kamyshin gained world-wide recognition for keeping Ukrainian trains working during the 2022 Russian invasion of Ukraine. Kamyshin resigned as CEO late February 2023 to become the head the European integration office of Ukrainian Railways. On 3 March 2023 he was appointed as a freelance Advisor to President of Ukraine Volodymyr Zelenskyy.

On 20 March 2023 parliament received Prime Minister Denys Shmyhal's submissions on the appointment of Kamyshin as Minister of Strategic Industries.

Kamyshin is married and raising two sons.

References

External links 

 

Living people
Railway executives
People of the 2022 Russian invasion of Ukraine
Ukrainian accountants
Ukrainian Railways
KPMG people
Auditors
SCM Holdings people
1984 births